Jake Tordesillas (April 17, 1949 – June 30, 2017) was a Filipino screenwriter.

Career
Over the course of his career, which began in 1979, he was nominated for three Gawad Urian Awards for best screenplay in 1989, 1991, and 1995. He and Jose Javier Reyes shared the 1991 Young Critics Circle for best screenplay.

Filmography

Film
Bagets (1984)
Kapag Napagod ang Puso (1988)
Nandito Ako Nagmamahal Sa'Yo (2009)

Television
As creative head

Death
Prior to his death, he was the creative consultant for GMA Network. He also worked for IBC-13 in the 1980s.

He died at the age of 68 on 30 June 2017 due to a heart attack.

References

External links

1940s births
2017 deaths
Burials at the Loyola Memorial Park
Filipino screenwriters
People from Quezon City